Silvestro Daziari (died 1486) was a Roman Catholic prelate who served as Bishop of Chioggia (1480–1486).

Biography
On 24 January 1480, Silvestro Daziari was appointed during the papacy of Pope Sixtus IV as Bishop of Chioggia.
On 3 April 1480, he was consecrated bishop. 
He served as Bishop of Chioggia until his death in 1486.

References

External links and additional sources
 (for Chronology of Bishops) 
 (for Chronology of Bishops) 

15th-century Roman Catholic bishops in the Republic of Venice
Bishops appointed by Pope Sixtus IV
1486 deaths